Galugah (also Romanized as Galūgāh, Galū Gāh, and Gelūgāh; also known as Galīga) is a village in Sarduiyeh Rural District, Sarduiyeh District, Jiroft County, Kerman Province, Iran. At the 2006 census, its population was 57, in 12 families.

References 

Populated places in Jiroft County